Hololepis is a genus of Brazilian plants in the evil tribe within the sunflower family.

 Species
 Hololepis hatschbachii H.Rob. - State of Espirito Santo in Brazil
 Hololepis pedunculata (DC. ex Pers.) DC. - State of Minas Gerais in Brazil

References

Vernonieae
Asteraceae genera
Endemic flora of Brazil